Billy Lee (William Lee Schlensker) (March 12, 1929 – November 17, 1989) was a child actor who appeared in many films from the mid-1930s through the early 1940s. He is probably best remembered for his performance in The Biscuit Eater.

Lee's first role was in the Our Gang comedy short Mike Fright as a tap dancer in a sailor suit. He was signed under contract with Paramount Pictures from 1934 to 1941 and his first significant role was in Wagon Wheels when he was just four years old.

Lee continued acting throughout the 1930s, appearing in a number of movies (among others: Too Many Parents, Easy to Take, Three Cheers for Love, Silk Hat Kid, The Big Broadcast of 1937, Sons of the Legion, Say It in French, Boy Trouble, Night Work, Sudden Money, Nobody's Children, Hold Back the Dawn, Nevada City,  Road to Happiness) and working alongside some of Hollywood's finest, including, Donald O'Connor, Lon Chaney Jr., Roy Rogers, Charles Boyer, Randolph Scott, Lew Ayres, Gene Autry, Robert Cummings, Basil Rathbone, Olivia de Havilland, John Boles, Fred MacMurray, Ray Milland and Broderick Crawford). He also did the voice of "The Boy" character in the animated portion of the Disney film, The Reluctant Dragon.

In addition to being an actor, he was also a singer and dancer, appearing and singing with Bobby Breen in Make a Wish and touring with vaudeville shows. For his role in Cocoanut Grove he learnt to play the drums and formed the Billy Lee Band. The band appeared in the 1941 film, Reg'lar Fellers, in which he starred with co-star Carl Switzer.

Lee retired from film in 1943 after his last film War Dogs.

Lee died on November 17, 1989, of a sudden heart attack.

References

Bibliography
 Holmstrom, John (1996). The Moving Picture Boy: An International Encyclopaedia from 1895 to 1995. Norwich, Michael Russell, p. 165-166.
 Best, Marc (1971). Those Endearing Young Charms: Child Performers of the Screen. South Brunswick and New York: Barnes & Co., p. 144-147.
 Willson, Dixie (1935). Little Hollywood Stars. Akron, OH, e New York: Saalfield Pub. Co., p. 133-142.
 Lamparski, Richard (1986). Whatever Became of...?. (Tenth Series). New York: Crown Publishers, p. 96-97.
 Liebman, Roy (2009). Musical Groups in the Movies, 1929-1970. Jefferson, N.C.: McFarland & Company, Inc. Publishers, p. 22.

External links
 Classic Movie Kids: Billy Lee
 
 

American male film actors
American male child actors
Male actors from Indiana
People from Beaumont, California
1929 births
1989 deaths
20th-century American male actors
People from Vigo County, Indiana
Our Gang